Edith Margaret Hannam (née Boucher; 28 November 1878 – 16 January 1951) was a female tennis player from Great Britain. She played at the 1912 Summer Olympics and won two gold medals.

Family life
Edith Margaret Boucher was born in Bristol, Gloucestershire on 28 November 1878, the daughter of John and Julia Boucher, her father was a pharmaceutical chemist.

Boucher married Francis John Hannam at Long Ashton in 1909, as a Captain in the Gloucestershire Regiment he was killed in action in France on 5 July 1916.

Tennis career
In 1909 at the tennis tournament in Cincinnati, Hannam won the singles and mixed doubles titles and was a doubles finalist. She beat Martha Kinsey in the final for the singles title, paired with Julius Frieberg to reach the doubles final, and teamed with Lincoln Mitchell to win the mixed doubles title.

At the 1912 Olympics Hannam won the gold medal in both the Woman's Singles indoor tournament, beating Danish player Sofie Castenschiold in straight sets, and in the Mixed Doubles indoor tournament with partner Charles Dixon. In 1914 she reached the Woman's Doubles finals at Wimbledon with partner Ethel Thomson Larcombe but lost in straight sets to Elizabeth Ryan and Agnes Morton.

Grand Slam finals

Doubles (1 runner-up)

References

External links
 
 Olympic profile

1878 births
1951 deaths
British female tennis players
English Olympic medallists
Olympic gold medallists for Great Britain
Olympic medalists in tennis
Olympic tennis players of Great Britain
Tennis people from Bristol
Tennis players at the 1912 Summer Olympics
Medalists at the 1912 Summer Olympics
English female tennis players